This is a list of nature centers and environmental education centers in the state of Vermont. 

To use the sortable tables: click on the icons at the top of each column to sort that column in alphabetical order; click again for reverse alphabetical order.

Resources
 Vermont Education and Environment Network

External links
Map of nature centers and environmental education centers in Vermont

 
Nature centers
Vermont